Phytoecia smatanai is a species of beetle in the family Cerambycidae. It was described by Holzschuh in 2003. It is known from Turkey.

References

Phytoecia
Beetles described in 2003